John Minihan may refer to:

 John Minihan (photographer) (born 1946), Irish photographer
 John Minihan (politician), Irish politician